Pilmography is the debut studio album by South Korean singer Wonpil. It was released on February 7, 2022, through Studio J and JYP Entertainment. The album consists of ten tracks, including the lead single "Voiceless".

Upon release, Pilmography debuted at number one on Gaon Album Chart, making it the first chart-topper for the artist.

Promotion 
On March 11-13, 2022, Wonpil held his first solo concert, also named Pilmography, at Yes24 Live Hall. On March 26-27, 2022, Wonpil held his additional encore shows at Kwangwoon University.

Track listing

Charts

Weekly charts

Monthly charts

Release history

References 

2022 debut albums
Korean-language albums